Brian William Rhodes (23 October 1937 – 17 November 1993) was an English footballer who played as a goalkeeper.

Born in Marylebone, Rhodes played professional football for West Ham United, joining the club as a junior before playing 61 league matches. After leaving West Ham Rhodes joined Southend United where he played 11 matches in 1963 and 1964.
In 1964 Rhodes emigrated to Australia where he played for South Coast United and represented the state of New South Wales.

References

1937 births
1993 deaths
West Ham United F.C. players
Southend United F.C. players
English footballers
English Football League players
South Coast United players
English expatriates in Australia
English expatriates in New Zealand
Footballers from Marylebone
Association football goalkeepers
Expatriate soccer players in Australia